Hebeloma moseri is a species of agaric fungus in the family Hymenogastraceae. Found in Argentina, it was described as new to science by mycologist Rolf Singer in 1969. The specific epithet moseri honors Austrian mycologist Meinhard Moser.

See also
List of Hebeloma species

References

External links

Fungi described in 1969
Fungi of South America
moseri